The 2018 Liga 3 East Java (known as Liga 3 Kapal Api for sponsorship reasons) is the third edition of Liga 3 (formerly known as Liga Nusantara) East Java as a qualifying round for the national round of 2018 Liga 3. Blitar United (now in 2018 Liga 2), winner of the 2017 Liga 3 East Java are the defending champions. The competition began on 1 April 2018.

Format
In this competition, 49 teams are divided into 7 groups of seven. The two best teams are through to knockout stage. The winner will represent East Java in national round of 2018 Liga 3.

Teams
There are 49 clubs which will participate the league in this season.

Group stage
This stage started on 1 April 2018.

Group A

Group B

Group C

Group D

Group E

Group F

Group G

References 

2018 in Indonesian football
Sport in East Java